Air Illinois  was a regional airline based in Carbondale, Illinois.

History
Founded in 1970 in Carbondale, Illinois, Air Illinois primarily operated small twin turboprop aircraft such as the de Havilland Canada DHC-6 Twin Otter. By 1978, the company acquired two 44-seat Hawker Siddeley HS 748 turboprops (tail registrations  N748LL and N749LL), which were mostly used to connect Springfield, Illinois with Chicago's Meigs Field. The HS 748 was the largest aircraft to use the lakefront airport on a regular basis. By far the company's most utilized aircraft was the Twin Otter, an eighteen-passenger aircraft noted for short field take-offs and landings (STOL) that was truly the company's workhorse. The company's two letter identifier was UX although the Official Airline Guide (OAG) states that Air Illinois also used the QX code for its stand-alone intrastate airline operation in Illinois between Chicago Meigs Field and the state capital in Springfield.

In December 1977, Air Illinois purchased the small Handley Page Jetstream fleet of South Central Air Transport (SCAT).  SCAT was based in Natchez, Mississippi and was incorporated by Andrew Peabody in 1971 to replace Southern Airways' Martin 4-0-4 flights between Natchez, Jackson and New Orleans. By 1976 SCAT flew between New Orleans and Jackson, Mississippi, New Orleans and Gulfport-Biloxi as well as on a route from New Orleans to Birmingham, Alabama with stops in Fort Walton Beach, Florida, Panama City, Florida, Montgomery, Alabama, and Mobile, Alabama. SCAT flew three of the 18 passenger Handley Page HP.137 MK1 Jetstream and two of the Frakes Pratt & Whitney PT-6 modified HP.137's (tail registrations N11DN and N7RJ). The airline tried to become a replacement carrier for Southern, but faced challenges trying to compete with Southern's DC-9s in the New Orleans market.  SCAT ended airline service during the summer of 1977.

In July 1982 the company leased two British Aircraft Corp. British Aircraft Corporation BAC One-Eleven (tail registrations N1542 and N1547) 74-passenger, twin jet aircraft from USAir, which were utilized mainly on scheduled routes from Springfield, Illinois, St. Louis, Missouri, Evansville, Indiana, and Waterloo and Cedar Rapids, Iowa to Chicago O'Hare. In addition, the company entered into agreements with the federal government and an Atlantic City-based casino to operate charter flights.

The crash

In October 1983, Air Illinois Flight 710 flying between Chicago, Illinois and Carbondale, Illinois via Springfield, Illinois crashed in poor weather near Pinckneyville, Illinois. Three crew members and seven passengers lost their lives.

Several weeks after the crash the FAA grounded the company and began official hearings into the crash. The cause was determined to be pilot error after the plane's generators failed two minutes after takeoff yet the crew elected to "push on" to their destination, crashing in a pasture when the plane lost all electrical power.

Following this, the company lost $1 million. Measures were taken to bring the safety to federal standards. Most company employees were placed on furlough and after an extensive rewrite of the company's operations manual the FAA granted an operating certificate for FAR part 121 flight operations which was composed of jet service utilizing their BAC One-Eleven aircraft. The operating certificate for the most lucrative part of their original operation, which was under FAR part 135 rules, was delayed. This fact, along with substantially lower passenger loads, led airline officials to cease operating and file for Chapter 11 bankruptcy in April 1984. Meanwhile, the commuter airline Air Midwest had dropped its plans to acquire Air Illinois.

Cities served

Air Illinois served the following destinations during its existence; however, not all of these destinations were served at the same time.  Those destinations noted in bold received BAC One-Eleven jet service.

Alton, Illinois
Bloomington, Indiana
Burlington, Iowa
Cape Girardeau, Missouri
Carbondale, Illinois - airline headquarters
 Cedar Rapids, Iowa
 Centralia, Illinois
Champaign-Urbana, Illinois
Chicago, Illinois - Meigs Field (CGX) and O'Hare Airport (ORD)
Columbia, Missouri
Columbus, Nebraska
Decatur, Illinois
 Evansville, Indiana
Jacksonville, Illinois
Jefferson City, Missouri
Jonesboro, Arkansas
Lake of the Ozarks, Missouri
Lincoln, Nebraska
Memphis, Tennessee
Mount Vernon, Illinois
Nashville, Tennessee
Natchez, Mississippi
Paducah, Kentucky
Peoria, Illinois
Quincy, Illinois
 Springfield, Illinois
 St. Louis, Missouri
Waterloo, Iowa

Fleet
Air Illinois was unique in the fact that during most of its existence it did not operate any aircraft that had been manufactured in the U.S.  The majority of its aircraft were built either in the United Kingdom or Canada. The exceptions were  two leased Beechcraft 99A aircraft in 1980, N949K & N1924T

2 – Beechcraft 99A Airliner
4 – British Aircraft Corporation BAC One-Eleven (only jet aircraft type operated by the airline)
6 – de Havilland Canada DHC-6 Twin Otter
7 – Handley Page HP.137 Jetstream
2 – Hawker Siddeley HS 748

See also
 List of defunct airlines of the United States

References

External links
 List of North American airlines A-M — brief mention

Airlines established in 1970
Airlines disestablished in 1984
Carbondale, Illinois
Companies based in Jackson County, Illinois
Defunct regional airlines of the United States
Defunct companies based in Illinois
1970 establishments in Illinois
1984 disestablishments in Illinois
Companies that filed for Chapter 11 bankruptcy in 1984
Defunct airlines of the United States
Airlines based in Illinois